Teykovo is a town in Ivanovo Oblast, Russia, located on the Vyazma River  southwest of Ivanovo. Population:     42,800 (1975).

History
It was founded in the 17th century and was granted town status in 1918.

Administrative and municipal status
Within the framework of administrative divisions, Teykovo serves as the administrative center of Teykovsky District, even though it is not a part of it. As an administrative division, it is incorporated separately as the Town of Teykovo—an administrative unit with the status equal to that of the districts. As a municipal division, the Town of Teykovo is incorporated as Teykovo Urban Okrug.

Military
The town is home to a Strategic Missile Division of the Strategic Rocket Forces where projects like the mobile Topol-M intercontinental ballistic missile system are operated from.

References

Notes

Sources

Cities and towns in Ivanovo Oblast
Shuysky Uyezd